The Muthers is a 1976 women in prison film. It starred Jeannie Bell, Rosanne Katon, Trina Parks, Jayne Kennedy, Tony Carreon and John Montgomery.

Quentin Tarantino later wrote, "So why is this cruddy little flick one of my favorite movies? It's the playful execution of a preposterous story that's the key to the film's charm."

Plot
Kelly and Angie lead a gang of modern-day pirates in the South Seas, passing on the valuables taken from rich travelers and shippers to comparably poor villagers. A Justice Department official informs Kelly that her sister Sandra has been swept up in a trafficking operation and isolated in a prison camp run by crime boss Montiero, disguised as a legitimate coffee plantation, and offers her gang immunity from prosecution if they can infiltrate and convey the information that will help them shut it down. When the women penetrate the camp, they eventually recruit longtime prisoner Marcie, and Montiero's mistress Serena, to forment a rebellion and escape from the compound.

Cast
 Jean Bell as Kelly (credited as Jeanne Bell)
 Rosanne Katon as Angie
 Trina Parks as Marcie
 Jayne Kennedy as Serena
 Tony Carreon as Monteiro (credited as J. Antonio Carrion)
 John Montgomery as Turko
 Sam Sharruff as Sancho
 Dick Piper as Murphy
 Ken Metcalfe as Barrows
 Rocco Montalban as Rocco (credited as Rock Monte)
 Bill Baldridge as Captain Montes
 Bert Olivar as Navarro (credited as Bert Oliver)

References

External links

1976 films
Philippine drama films
Women in prison films
Blaxploitation films
1970s English-language films
Films directed by Cirio H. Santiago